"Dear Mama" is a song by 2Pac.

Dear Mama may also refer to:

Film and TV
Dear Mama, 1984 Philippines film Snooky Serna, Julie Vega, Janice de Belen
Dear Mama, 2016 VH1 Mothers Day honors event hosted by comedian Anthony Anderson, Mary J. Blige, Alicia Keys

Music
"Dear Mama" (B Flow song), a song from the 2016 album of the same name
"Dear Mama" (Ai song), a song from Ai's 2013 album Moriagaro